All That Glitters is an American sitcom by producer Norman Lear. It consisted of 65 episodes, running five nights a week between April 18 and July 15, 1977, in broadcast syndication. The show, a spoof of the soap opera format, depicted the trials and tribulations of a group of executives at the Globatron corporation. The twist of the series was that it was set within a world of complete role-reversal: Women were the "stronger sex," the executives and breadwinners, while the "weaker sex" – the men – were the secretaries or stay-at-home househusbands. Men were often treated as sex objects.

The series featured Eileen Brennan, Greg Evigan, Lois Nettleton, Gary Sandy, Tim Thomerson and Jessica Walter. Comic actor and cartoon voice artist Chuck McCann was also a regular. Linda Gray played transgender fashion model Linda Murkland, the first transgender series regular on American television.  Critically, All That Glitters was negatively received and a ratings disappointment across syndicated television stations.

Production
All That Glitters was series creator Norman Lear's attempt to duplicate his success with the syndicated soap opera spoof Mary Hartman, Mary Hartman. Lear described the premise simply: "God created Eve first, took out her rib and gave her a companion so she wouldn't be lonely." Lear came up with the idea on a trip to Washington, D.C.: 

The world of All That Glitters had always been female-dominated, but Lear also used the series to comment on changing sex roles in the United States in the 1970s. Under the working title Womb at the Top, All That Glitters was co-created by longtime soap writer Ann Marcus, with a transgender consultant hired to help Linda Gray develop her character Linda Murkland as well as Eve Merriam, whose off-broadway show The Club featured women as turn-of-the-century male chauvinists "strutting around in top hats and tails and telling sexist jokes."

Former Major League Baseball player Wes Parker practically walked into his role. He was doing play-by-play reporting for a Los Angeles television station owned by Lear's partner, Jerry Perenchio. "Lear casually asked if I'd be interested in the part. I said yes, but knew it was out of the question, because in real life things don't happen that way. Nobody walks in and gets on a Norman Lear show. I read for the part, got it and didn't sleep at all that night."

Linda Gray was somewhat nonplussed upon being offered the role of transgender Linda Murkland. "I remember meeting Norman and him saying, 'You'll be perfect for the role.' I didn't know whether to take that as a compliment or what." To prepare for her role, Linda Gray asked Lear to arrange for her to meet with a transgender woman. Gray met with her for several hours prior to the beginning of filming and on a couple of occasions during production.

Lois Nettleton reportedly based her characterization of Christina Stockwood on Clark Gable. Production started in early March 1977 with director Herbert Kenwith.

In test screenings prior to its premiere, reaction to the show was sharply divided. According to executive producer Stephanie Sills, the strongest negative reaction came from male executives. "They didn't mind being portrayed by women. It was simply that they detest the way we depicted them." Feminists were uncertain how to react to the series, with some being concerned that audiences would not perceive the show as satire but as an attempt to represent how a female-dominated society would actually operate. Lear marketed the program through his company, TAT Syndication.

Cast
 Barbara Baxley as L.W. Carruthers, President of Globatron
 Eileen Brennan as Ma Packer
 Vanessa Brown as Peggy Horner, Globatron executive
 Anita Gillette as Nancy Langston, Globatron executive
 Linda Gray as Linda Murkland, a trans woman model
 Jim Greenleaf as Jeremy Stockwood, Christina's son
 David Haskell as Michael McFarland, Andrea's boyfriend
 Chuck McCann as Bert Stockwood, Christina's husband
 Lois Nettleton as Christina Stockwood, Globatron executive
 Wes Parker as Glenn Langston, Nancy's husband
 Gary Sandy as Dan Kincaid, Globatron secretary
 Louise Shaffer as Andrea Martin, lawyer
 Marte Boyle Slout as Grace Smith, Globatron executive
 Tim Thomerson as Sonny Packer
 Jessica Walter as Joan Hamlyn, agent
 Marilyn Sokol as Farrah Abuban
 Danny DeVito as Baba, Farrah's concubine

Critical reaction
All That Glitters debuted the week of April 18, 1977, on about 40 stations in late-night syndication. It was poorly critically received, with one reviewer going so far as to call the show's theme song "blasphemous" for suggesting that God was female and created Eve first. Time magazine sharply criticized the series, calling it "embarrassingly amateurish", with "flaccid" and "wearying" jokes, flat writing, "mediocre" acting and "aimless" direction. The Wall Street Journal concurred, saying that while the series' role-reversal premise may have been adequate for a play or film, it was too limiting to serve as the basis for a continuing series. These limitations showed up most clearly, the Journal says, in the lead performances. Although praising the performers themselves as talented, they are cited for being "unable to infuse much life into their roles". The Journal pegs the fundamental problem with All That Glitters as that "its characters are not people at all, merely composites of the least attractive characteristics of each sex. The satire focuses not on the way real, recognizable people behave, but on stereotypes and cliches about masculine and feminine attitudes. Even when stood on their heads, they still remain stereotypes and cliches."

New Times magazine was much more receptive to the series. Although labeling it "unquestionably the weirdest [show] that Lear has ever produced", New Times found that the series was not "a satire of mannerisms but of attitudes". All That Glitters required that viewers watch closely to pick up on the subtleties and nuances, "not so much for what the show says, but for the way that it's said".

All That Glitters, after initially capturing 20% of viewers in major markets in its opening weeks, had lost about half of that audience midway through its run. The series was cancelled after 13 weeks, last airing on July 15, 1977. Although the show was panned, it and Lear, along with Mary Hartman, Mary Hartman, are credited with expanding the subject matter that television producers were able to explore with lessened fear of antagonizing sponsors or viewers.

In the years since the series, it has garnered something of a positive reputation, with one critic listing it and other Lear efforts as "imaginative shows that contained some of the most striking satires of television and American society ever broadcast".

While the show itself was unsuccessful, it did spawn a hit song. "You Don't Bring Me Flowers", which had been written with the intention of its being the theme song, was recorded by Neil Diamond and Barbra Streisand and made it to #1 on the Billboard Hot 100. By the time the show made it to air, another song had been chosen as the theme. The replacement, "Genesis Revisited", was later described by The New York Times as "sparkl[ing] with witty rhymes and a punchy good humor". The song was performed by Kenny Rankin. The lyrics for both songs were written by Alan and Marilyn Bergman (the music for "Genesis Revisited" is credited solely to Alan Bergman).

Further reading 
 Miller Taylor Cole. Syndicated Queerness: Television Talk Shows, Rerun Syndication, and the Serials of Norman Lear. dissertation, University of Wisconsin–Madison, 2017.

References

Bibliography
 
 
 
 Television/radio Age (1976). New York, Television Editorial Corp. . .

External links

1977 American television series debuts
1977 American television series endings
1970s American sitcoms
American LGBT-related sitcoms
American television soap operas
English-language television shows
First-run syndicated television programs in the United States
Television series by Sony Pictures Television
Television series created by Norman Lear
Television shows set in Washington, D.C.
Transgender-related television shows
Fictional transgender women
1970s American LGBT-related television series